Roger the Homunculus is a fictional character featured in the Hellboy and B.P.R.D. comic books published by Dark Horse Comics. He is an unusually large homunculus, a humanoid being said to be created by means of alchemy. Initially revived by Liz Sherman, Roger is one of the early supporting characters of the "Mignola-verse", appearing alongside other "enhanced" B.P.R.D. agents including Sherman, Abe Sapien and Johann Kraus under Dr. Kate Corrigan.

Fictional character biography
Roger was discovered in 1996 in a medieval alchemist's lab beneath the ruins of Czege Castle, Romania by BPRD agents Liz Sherman, Bud Waller, and Sidney Leach during the Wake the Devil affair. Waller explained that a homunculus is created from blood and herbs, stewed in a jar, and then incubated in horse manure. Although lifeless upon discovery, the as-yet nameless Roger was activated when Liz touched the socket on his chest, absorbing her pyrokinesis as she was subconsciously looking to rid herself of it. As Liz enters a coma, Roger springs to life in a violent rage, killing Waller before fleeing the castle into the countryside. After Liz is rushed to the hospital under the supervision of BPRD doctors, Hellboy and Kate Corrigan arrive to find the homunculus in the hope that Liz's power could be restored to her. Meanwhile, the homunculus was racked by guilt and prayed for God to kill him. However, he soon encountered his 'brother', a more crude homunculus created before himself.

The brother sought to take revenge on humanity using a colossal homunculus that he created from human fat. The sinister homunculus captured Kate and planned to sacrifice her for use in the giant homunculus. Roger saved her, but his brother entered the body of the gigantic colossus and began to rampage. While Hellboy struggled against the colossal homunculus, Roger intervened by asking his brother to forgive him. His brother forgave him, and Roger is allowed to join the colossus. Roger then used Liz's power over fire to melt the giant body and slay his brother. Roger returned to base with Hellboy and Kate, and restored Liz's pyrokinesis. Roger, now without a source of energy, returned to his comatose state.

Three years later, BPRD scientists were stopped from dissecting Roger's comatose body by Abe Sapien, who used an overdose of electricity to awaken the dormant homunculus. The BPRD fitted Roger with a mobile generator and made him an agent. At the same time, they planted a bomb within him to prevent any uncontrolled outbursts. This decision would later be a factor in Hellboy leaving the Bureau. However, during the Hunte Castle affair in 2001, Roger proved himself as an agent at last when he managed to contain the Conqueror Worm (an energy-based monster from space) within himself, which nearly subsumed his psyche as he managed to destroy Herman von Klempt by throwing them both off a mountain. Roger was saved by the ghost of Lobster Johnson, who used a lightning rod to shock the worm out of Roger.

B.P.R.D.
Roger returned to work with the Bureau, fitted with a new generator. During the invasion of America by frog monsters Roger proved to be very effective in wiping them out and eventually was promoted to a leadership role with his own squadron of agents. However, his new-found cockiness proved to be his undoing. Surprised by the villainous Black Flame, who was leading the frog monsters, Roger and his team were blown to pieces.

Kate Corrigan went to France to secure the book that could restore Roger to full health. However, the ageless marquis who held the book attempted to bargain for Roger's corpse, using Kate as collateral. Kate managed to overpower the marquis by releasing the demon Marchosias, but in the ensuing carnage the book was lost and Roger's fate was sealed. As of the end of The Universal Machine, Roger's body remains destroyed. When Johann Krauss communicates with Roger's spirit and asks him why he has not "gone on," Roger explains that because he is not human, there is no place for his spirit to go, so it simply remains within his body. Roger's spirit exists in a peaceful dream-world resembling an Etruscan shrine dedicated to Cloacina.

Roger tells Johann that he is finally at peace and would prefer to stay "dead," but tells Johann that he would like his body to be buried in the ground, "like a man." Roger's grave, marked with a false identity of "Archie Stanton", was shown in the first issue of B.P.R.D.: The Garden of Souls. It is engraved with a quotation from the King James Version of Job Chapter 32, Verse 9: "Great men are not always wise."

In other media
 A statue of Roger can be seen in Hellboy and Hellboy II: The Golden Army.
 The Hellboy Archive

References

Comics characters with superhuman strength
Hellboy characters
Dark Horse Comics superheroes
Comics characters introduced in 1996
Characters created by Mike Mignola

pt:Roger (Hellboy)